Heisei Kenkyūkai (Heisei Research Council) is a faction within the Liberal Democratic Party (LDP). It is currently led by Toshimitsu Motegi, the current secretary-general of the LDP. It is considered to be centrist.

References 

Political party factions in Japan
1987 establishments in Japan
Liberal Democratic Party (Japan)